Bosco may refer to:

Bosco (footballer, born 1974), João Bosco de Freitas Chaves, Brazilian goalkeeper
Bosco (footballer, born 1980), Ricardo Sales Alves do Santos, Brazilian defender